Marc-Kevin Goellner and Richey Reneberg were the defending champions, but did not participate together this year.  Goellner partnered Wayne Ferreira, losing in the quarterfinals.  Reneberg partnered Jonathan Stark, losing in the semifinals.

Nicklas Kulti and Mikael Tillström won the title, defeating Chris Haggard and Peter Nyborg 7–5, 3–6, 7–5 in the final.

Seeds

Draw

Draw

External links
Draw

1998 Stockholm Open
1998 ATP Tour